Kazalla or Kazallu is the name given in Akkadian sources to a city in the ancient Near East whose locations is unknown. Its god is Numushda.

History
Under its king Kashtubila, Kazalla warred against Sargon of Akkad in the 24th or 23rd century BC. Sargon laid the city of Kazalla to waste so effectively that "the birds could not find a place to perch away from the ground." The city was briefly under the control of Elam under Puzur-Inshushinak until Elam fell to Ur. Under the Ur III empire, the city was ruled by ensi (governors). Some of them, Ititi, Izariq, Kallamu, Šu-Mama, and  Apillaša (appointed in year 7 of Amar-Suen), are known by name. All during the reigns of Shulgi and Amar-Suen. There is a letter from Ibbi-Sin, the last ruler of Ur III, and Puzur-Numušda 1 who he had made governor of Kazallu, complaining that he was not doing enough to oppose Ishbi-Erra, ruler of Isin.

In the early 2nd millennium BC the city had a number of conflicts with Larsa. A year name of Sin-Iqisham marks the destruction of Kazullu. A year name of Ward-Sin lists the destruction of the walls of Kazullu. Larsa ruler Kudur-Mabuk also reports repelling the forces of Kazullu. A ruler of Isin, Erra-imitti, also claimed to have destroyed Kazullu. Lastly, mulbalum, ruler of Esnunna claimed to have defeated a coalition which included Kazallu. Kazallu briefly became a city-state in its own right before falling to Babylon. The 13th year name of Babylonian ruler Sumu-abum lists the destruction of Kazallu.

Location
According to a tablet from the reign of Gudea of Lagash, Kazalla was located somewhere to the west of Mesopotamia, in the land of Martu. According to a letter to Ibbi-Sîn the Martu were hindering travel between Ur and Kazallu. Some scholars today believe it was only about 15 km from the city of Babylon, and just west of the Euphrates. In texts from Drehem the city is said to be to the east of the unlocated city of Girtab. Old Babylonian records have it as being in the area of Marad (modern Tell as-Sadoum).

See also
Cities of the ancient Near East

References

Former populated places in Southwest Asia